is a 1980 Japanese super robot mecha anime series. A film with the same title was released on December 19, 1981.

Production
The anime television series was produced by Ashi Productions and Kokusai Eiga-sha with a feature film (with a strong environmental theme) distributed by Toei in 1981. While 39 episodes were intended, only 34 were ultimately finished, with 31 airing on TV. Some, but not all of the events that would have been in the final 5 episodes were compressed into the film. The name of the Baldios mecha was unchanged, although it played a small part in the film. In Italy, the series and film were shown as Baldios, Il Guerriero dello Spazio. In Cuba, another feature-film version of Baldios was released in theaters (including violence removed from the American version) as Yaltus.

Story
The TV series begins on S-1, a futuristic world whose wartime pollution has forced its occupants to live underground. Its emperor is assassinated by military fanatic Zeo Gattler and his followers, who frame the team of scientists who recently found a solution to their planet's environmental decay. Gattler's followers invade the head scientist's laboratory, killing the environmentalists and destroying their work. He loads the civilian population aboard a fortress, the Algol, and flies off to conquer a new planet. Angered by Gattler's devious actions, the lead scientist's son (protagonist Marin Raygun) tries to escape. Before he can, he is caught in the Algol warp drive and finds himself near Earth in the year 2100. When he sees a Martian colony destroyed by Gattler's Aldebaren Army, Marin joins the military organization Blue Fixer. His ship becomes part of Blue Fixer's mecha, the space warrior Baldios. Marin and the Blue Fixer team (Jamie Hoshino, combat pilots Jack Oliver and Raita Hokuto, researcher Ella Quinstein and commander Takeshi Tsukikage) defend Earth against Gattler and the S-1 force. The conflict ends when Gattler triggers a massive tsunami by melting Earth's polar ice caps with artificial suns, flooding the planet and killing millions. Blue Fixer is helpless to stop it, and Marin watches the waves in horror. They remove the radioactive core of the World Union submarine base, which threatened to contaminate Earth, transporting it to the Aldebaren fleet where it kills Gattler, his troops and Commander Tsukikage.

The Baldios film contains a final confrontation between Marin and Gattler. In the series and the film, S-1 and Earth are the same planet. Gattler and his troops' time travel caused the same pollution which forced them to leave S-1, closing the time loop.

External links
 
 

1980 anime television series debuts
1981 anime films
1981 Japanese television series endings
Adventure anime and manga
Animated films based on animated series
Animated space adventure television series
Apocalyptic films
Discotek Media
Drama anime and manga
Japanese animated films
1980s Japanese-language films
Ashi Productions
Super robot anime and manga
TV Tokyo original programming